Reformation 01 is a box set by VNV Nation that was released on 24 April 2009 in Europe and 12 May 2009 in North America containing; a 12 track live CD, a 13 track Bonus Disc of remixes and previously unreleased material, and a DVD with 8 videos of live footage recorded from 2005 to 2008. Only 18,000 copies were released worldwide.

It charted at no. 48 in the mainstream German album charts.

Track listing

References

External links
 VNV Nation Website
 VNV Nation MySpace Page
 

VNV Nation albums
2009 compilation albums
2009 remix albums